WASJ (105.1 FM, "Bob FM 105.1") is a radio station broadcasting an adult hits music format, under the Bob FM branding. Licensed to Panama City Beach, Florida, United States, the station is currently owned by Aaron S. Lee, through licensee Great American Media, L.L.C.

History
The station began broadcasting in 1991 under the call sign WSEA. The station was virtually silent until January 1993, when it began holding the call sign WAKT. The station aired a country music format and was branded "Kat Kountry 105.1".

In 2002, after switching formats with WMXP, the station's call sign was changed to WASJ. The station adopted a smooth jazz format and was branded "Smooth Jazz 105.1". In January 2008, the station switched to a sports format, as an affiliate of ESPN Radio. In May 2008, the station adopted an adult hits format, as "Bob FM".

In the aftermath of Hurricane Michael, Powell Broadcasting announced that it would cease operation of its Panama City stations, leaving the future of its licenses in the market in limbo.

WASJ and its two sisters were sold in December 2018 to Gulf Coast Broadcasting, and WASJ returned to the air the next month, continuing the "Bob FM" adult hits format. The sale was consummated on April 30, 2019 at a price of $325,000.

On July 3, 2019, Gulf Coast broadcasting sold WASJ, WRBA, and WKNK to Great American Media for $700,000. The sale was consummated on September 26, 2019.

References

External links

ASJ
Bob FM stations
1993 establishments in Florida
Radio stations established in 1993
Adult hits radio stations in the United States